George Nash may refer to:

 George K. Nash (1842–1904), American politician
 George Nash (cricketer) (1850–1903), English cricketer
 George Valentine Nash (1864–1921), American botanist
 George Nash (baseball) (1907–1976), American baseball player
 George H. Nash (born 1945), American historian of conservatism
 George Nash (rower) (born 1989), English rower